Jamaica  has competed in seventeen of the twenty previous Commonwealth Games; starting at the second Games in 1934.

Host nation
Jamaica has hosted the Games once, in 1966 at Kingston, Jamaica

Overall medal tally
At the 2006 Commonwealth Games, Jamaica was seventh in the medal tally, and was tenth in the All-time tally of medals, with an overall total of 105 medals (40 Gold, 30 Silver and 35 Bronze).

References

 

 
Nations at the Commonwealth Games